William Pitt Cassidy (4 October 1940 – 9 March 1995) was a Scottish professional football player and manager. He made 174 English Football League appearances playing for Rotherham United, Brighton & Hove Albion and Cambridge United. He also played one Scottish League match as a trialist for Hamilton Academical, and spent the 1968 North American Soccer League season with the Detroit Cougars. He also played junior football for Burnbank Swifts and Coltness United and English non-league football for Chelmsford City, Kettering Town and Ramsgate Athletic. He went on to act as player-coach of Highland League club Brora Rangers and managed Ross County, also of the Highland League.

Cassidy was born in Hamilton, South Lanarkshire, in 1940 and died in Oxford in 1995 at the age of 54.

Notes

References

1940 births
1995 deaths
Footballers from Hamilton, South Lanarkshire
Scottish footballers
Association football wing halves
Association football inside forwards
Hamilton Academical F.C. players
Newmains United Community F.C. players
Rangers F.C. players
Rotherham United F.C. players
Brighton & Hove Albion F.C. players
Chelmsford City F.C. players
Detroit Cougars (soccer) players
Cambridge United F.C. players
Kettering Town F.C. players
Ramsgate F.C. players
Brora Rangers F.C. players
Scottish Junior Football Association players
Scottish Football League players
English Football League players
Southern Football League players
North American Soccer League (1968–1984) players
Highland Football League players
Scottish football managers
Ross County F.C. managers
Scottish expatriate sportspeople in the United States
Expatriate soccer players in the United States
Scottish expatriate footballers
Association football coaches
Highland Football League managers